Neidenburg is a 14th-century castle located in Nidzica, Poland.

The construction of the castle was begun around 1370. The Pfleger of the Teutonic Knights made it his residence in 1409. On 12t July 1410, the undefended castle was captured by the Polish forces on their way into the interior of the State of the Teutonic Order. At the time of the Hunger War of 1414 the castle was put under siege by the Polish knights and taken after eight days on the 6th of July. In 1454 the castle was occupied by the Prussian Union and in February 1455 was taken by the Czech army led by Jan Kolda ze Zampachu, who had repulsed an attack an by the forces of the Teutonic Knights on 28 April. In 1517 the inner ward was built up and reinforced. 

In 1784 a fire consumed the inner ward. In 1812 the castle was devastated by French forces. The castle was rebuilt from 1828 to 1830 into a court and a prison. The Soviet army bombarded the castle in 1945 and it remained in ruins until its rebuilding in 1961–1965. The Soviets ceded the area to Poland and the German name was changed to Nidzica.

See also
 Castles in Poland

References
The castle in Nidzica

Castles of the Teutonic Knights
Castles in Warmian-Masurian Voivodeship